Ariel Hernán "Chino" Garcé (born 14 July 1979), is a former Argentine football defender. He played as a central defender or right back in River Plate, Colón de Santa Fe, Olimpo de Bahía Blanca and Atlético de Rafaela.

Career

Club 

Garcé started his career with River Plate in 1999. He was part of two championship winning squads before moving on loan to Monarcas Morelia in Mexico in 2003. Garcé returned to River Plate in 2004 and helped the club to win the Clausura 2004 tournament.

Garcé then had his first spell with Colón de Santa Fe, before playing for Olimpo de Bahía Blanca and Rosario Central. While at Olimpo, Garcé was banned for 6 months by the Argentine federation after he tested positive of cocaine.

In 2007, he returned for a second spell with Colón.

In 2014, he played for Atlético de Rafaela finishing his career in that club.

International 

Garcé played two friendly matches under Marcelo Bielsa's coaching for the Argentina national football team in 2003. He then played a friendly against Haiti under Diego Maradona. On 19 May 2010, Garcé was surprisingly selected as one of the 23 men to play for Argentina in the 2010 FIFA World Cup in South Africa though he did not feature in any match. According to Maradona, he saw a dream of an Argentina squad winning the World Cup, and the only face he could remember was Garcé's.

Career statistics

International

Honours
River Plate
Argentine Primera División (3): Clausura 2000, Clausura 2002, Clausura 2004

References

External links
 Statistics at Irish Times
 
 Argentine Primera statistics at Fútbol XXI  

1979 births
Living people
Sportspeople from Buenos Aires Province
Argentine footballers
Argentine expatriate footballers
Association football defenders
Club Atlético River Plate footballers
Atlético Morelia players
Club Atlético Colón footballers
Olimpo footballers
Rosario Central footballers
Atlético de Rafaela footballers
Argentinos Juniors footballers
Argentine Primera División players
Liga MX players
Expatriate footballers in Mexico
Argentina international footballers
Argentine expatriate sportspeople in Mexico
2010 FIFA World Cup players